Askat Zhantursynov (born 18 September 1994, in Aukhatty, Kazakhstan) is a Master of Sports of the Republic of Kazakhstan (International Class) in kickboxing, six-time champion of Kazakhstan, two-time champion of Asia and the owner of the World Cup 2016 in kickboxing. Since 2018 Askat is a professional boxer in the first heavyweight category.

Biography 
Askat Zhantursynov was born on September 18, 1994, in Aukhatty, Kordai district, Zhambyl region, Kazakhstan. Askat started kickboxing when he was 13 years old under the guidance of Talai Duishekeev at the "School of higher sportsmanship" in Taraz.  Before switching to boxing, he successfully performed in tournaments in kickboxing. He trains in Almaty. His trainer is Sagatbek Musakhanov.

Professional career 
His professional debut took place on July 28, 2018, in Austin Sports Center in Austin (Texas, United States) against American Pete Rayna. Askat won the fight by technical knockout in the second round.

The second fight took place on September 29, 2018, in the universal sports palace "Wings of the Soviets" in Moscow against Latvian boxer Edgars Kalnars. The fight ended with Askat's victory by technical knockout in the first round.

Askat had his third professional fight against the American Michael Coronado on December 8, 2018, at the Austin Sports Center in Austin, Texas. The fight ended with Askat's victory by TKO in the second round.

On March 24, 2019, Zantursynov had his fourth fight in his professional career in the multifunctional complex Almaty Arena, where his rival was Georgian boxer Ramazi Gogichashvili. The six-round fight in the first heavyweight ended in Zhantursynov's victory by a split decision of the judges.

Askat's fifth fight was planned for October 9, 2020. Due to the fact that his opponent from Azerbajdzhan (Kazim Umudov) could not arrive in time, the fight did not take place in Almaty. Another opportunity was quickly found, so that Zhantursynov completed his fifth fight just days later on October 15, 2020, in Minsk, Belarus. His opponent was Ruslan Rodzivich. The fight ended already in the first round with a knock out by Zhantursynov, so that Askat could celebrate his fifth victory in series.

On December 18, 2021, Zantursynov had his six fight in his professional career in the capital of Kazahstan, Nur-Sultan. His opponent was Surat Garayev from Azerbaijan. By unanimous decision of the judges Zantursynov lost this fight. Due to the injury received in the middle of the fight (according to commentators Zhantursynov fought with a broken nose - because his face was constantly flooded with blood), the fight was interrupted 3 times for medical examination of Askat.

Table of professional fights

Awards 
Order from the Department of Sport of Taraz «Облысқа сінiрген енбегi үшін белгісiмен марапатталады Oblyska sinirgen yenbegi ushin belgisimen marapattaldy» (For services to the region).

External links 
Askat Zhantursynov on BoxRec

Askat Zhantursynov on WAKO Ranking

Askat Zhantursynov on Instagram

Askat Zhantyrsynov on Одноклассники

Askat Zhantyrsynov on YouTube

References 

Living people
1994 births